Nicholas Edward Palatas (born January 22, 1988) is an American actor. Palatas has appeared in short films including The Erogenous Zone, Love, and Air We Breathe and has been in several ads. In 2009, he played Norville "Shaggy" Rogers in the film Scooby-Doo! The Mystery Begins and reprised the role in Scooby-Doo! Curse of the Lake Monster which aired in October 2010. A newcomer to the Scooby-Doo series, Palatas took over for Matthew Lillard. Palatas is of Slovakian, English and German descent.

Personal life 
Palatas married his wife Marissa Denig in 2012. Denig filled for divorce from Palatas in 2017; the divorce was finalized in 2019.

Filmography

References

External links

1988 births
21st-century American male actors
American male film actors
American male television actors
Living people
Male actors from Maryland
People from Bethesda, Maryland
American male voice actors